The 2008–09 Solomon Islands National Club Championship was the 6th season of the National Club Championship in the Solomon Islands. Marist F.C. won the league for the second time. All matches were played at the hillside ground called Lawson Tama Stadium, with an approximate capacity of 20,000.

Teams 
 Banika Bulls
 Fasi Roos
 Gossa
 Koloale
 KOSSA
 Makuru
 Malango
 Malu'u United
 Marist
 Soloso
 Sunbeam
 Uncles FC

Pools

Pool A

Pool B

Knockout stage

Semi-finals

Third place match

Final

References 

Solomon Islands S-League seasons
Solomon
football
Solomon
football